Jørgen Nielsen may refer to:

 Jørgen Nielsen (footballer, born 1923)
 Jørgen Nielsen (footballer, born 1971), Danish football goalkeeper
 Jorgen Nielsen (football manager), Danish footballer and manager
 Jørgen S. Nielsen (born 1946), professor of Islamic studies
 Jørgen Boye Nielsen (1925-2000), Danish Olympic hockey player
 Jørgen Erik Nielsen (1933–2007), professor of literature